40 Gigabit Ethernet (40GbE) and 100 Gigabit Ethernet (100GbE) are groups of computer networking technologies for transmitting Ethernet frames at rates of 40 and 100 gigabits per second (Gbit/s), respectively. These technologies offer significantly higher speeds than 10 Gigabit Ethernet. The technology was first defined by the IEEE 802.3ba-2010 standard and later by the 802.3bg-2011, 802.3bj-2014, 802.3bm-2015, and 802.3cd-2018 standards.

The standards define numerous port types with different optical and electrical interfaces and different numbers of optical fiber strands per port. Short distances (e.g. 7 m) over twinaxial cable are supported while standards for fiber reach up to 80 km.

Standards development 
On July 18, 2006, a call for interest for a High Speed Study Group (HSSG) to investigate new standards for high speed Ethernet was held at the IEEE 802.3 plenary meeting in San Diego.

The first 802.3 HSSG study group meeting was held in September 2006. In June 2007, a trade group called "Road to 100G" was formed after the NXTcomm trade show in Chicago.

On December 5, 2007, the Project Authorization Request (PAR) for the P802.3ba 40 Gbit/s and 100 Gbit/s Ethernet Task Force was approved with the following project scope:

The purpose of this project is to extend the 802.3 protocol to operating speeds of 40 Gbit/s and 100 Gbit/s in order to provide a significant increase in bandwidth while maintaining maximum compatibility with the installed base of 802.3 interfaces, previous investment in research and development, and principles of network operation and management. The project is to provide for the interconnection of equipment satisfying the distance requirements of the intended applications.

The 802.3ba task force met for the first time in January 2008. This standard was approved at the June 2010 IEEE Standards Board meeting under the name IEEE Std 802.3ba-2010.

The first 40 Gbit/s Ethernet Single-mode Fibre PMD study group meeting was held in January 2010 and on March 25, 2010 the P802.3bg Single-mode Fibre PMD Task Force was approved for the 40 Gbit/s serial SMF PMD.

The scope of this project is to add a single-mode fiber Physical Medium Dependent (PMD) option for serial 40 Gbit/s operation by specifying additions to, and appropriate modifications of, IEEE Std 802.3-2008 as amended by the IEEE P802.3ba project (and any other approved amendment or corrigendum).

On June 17, 2010, the IEEE 802.3ba standard was approved. In March 2011, the IEEE 802.3bg standard was approved. On September 10, 2011, the P802.3bj 100 Gbit/s Backplane and Copper Cable task force was approved.

The scope of this project is to specify additions to and appropriate modifications of IEEE Std 802.3 to add 100 Gbit/s 4-lane Physical Layer (PHY) specifications and management parameters for operation on backplanes and twinaxial copper cables, and specify optional Energy Efficient Ethernet (EEE) for 40 Gbit/s and 100 Gbit/s operation over backplanes and copper cables.

On May 10, 2013, the P802.3bm 40 Gbit/s and 100 Gbit/s Fiber Optic Task Force was approved.

This project is to specify additions to and appropriate modifications of IEEE Std 802.3 to add 100 Gbit/s Physical Layer (PHY) specifications and management parameters, using a four-lane electrical interface for operation on multimode and single-mode fiber optic cables, and to specify optional Energy Efficient Ethernet (EEE) for 40 Gbit/s and 100 Gbit/s operation over fiber optic cables. In addition, to add 40 Gbit/s Physical Layer (PHY) specifications and management parameters for operation on extended reach (>10 km) single-mode fiber optic cables.

Also on May 10, 2013, the P802.3bq 40GBASE-T Task Force was approved.

Specify a Physical Layer (PHY) for operation at 40 Gbit/s on balanced twisted-pair copper cabling, using existing Media Access Control, and with extensions to the appropriate physical layer management parameters.

On June 12, 2014, the IEEE 802.3bj standard was approved.

On February 16, 2015, the IEEE 802.3bm standard was approved.

On May 12, 2016, the IEEE P802.3cd Task Force started working to define next generation two-lane 100 Gbit/s PHY.

On May 14, 2018, the PAR for the IEEE P802.3ck Task Force was approved. The scope of this project is to specify additions to and appropriate modifications of IEEE Std 802.3 to add Physical Layer specifications and Management Parameters for 100 Gbit/s, 200 Gbit/s, and 400 Gbit/s electrical interfaces based on 100 Gbit/s signaling.

On December 5, 2018, the IEEE-SA Board approved the IEEE 802.3cd standard.

On November 12, 2018, the IEEE P802.3ct Task Force started working to define PHY supporting 100 Gbit/s operation on a single wavelength capable of at least 80 km over a DWDM system (using a combination of phase and amplitude modulation with coherent detection).

In May 2019, the IEEE P802.3cu Task Force started working to define single-wavelength 100 Gbit/s PHYs for operation over SMF (Single-Mode Fiber) with lengths up to at least 2 km (100GBASE-FR1) and 10 km (100GBASE-LR1).

In June 2020, the IEEE P802.3db Task Force started working to define a physical layer specification that supports 100 Gbit/s operation over 1 pair of MMF with lengths up to at least 50 m.

On February 11, 2021, the IEEE-SA Board approved the IEEE 802.3cu standard.

On June 16, 2021, the IEEE-SA Board approved the IEEE 802.3ct standard.

On September 21, 2022, the IEEE-SA Board approved the IEEE 802.3ck and 802.3db standards.

Early products
Optical signal transmission over a nonlinear medium is principally an analog design problem. As such, it has evolved slower than digital circuit lithography (which generally progressed in step with Moore's law). This explains why 10 Gbit/s transport systems existed since the mid-1990s, while the first forays into 100 Gbit/s transmission happened about 15 years later – a 10x speed increase over 15 years is far slower than the 2x speed per 1.5 years typically cited for Moore's law.

Nevertheless, at least five firms (Ciena, Alcatel-Lucent, MRV, ADVA Optical and Huawei) made customer announcements for 100 Gbit/s transport systems by August 2011, with varying degrees of capabilities. Although vendors claimed that 100 Gbit/s light paths could use existing analog optical infrastructure, deployment of high-speed technology was tightly controlled and extensive interoperability tests were required before moving them into service.

Designing routers or switches which support 100 Gbit/s interfaces is difficult. The need to process a 100 Gbit/s stream of packets at line rate without reordering within IP/MPLS microflows is one reason for this.

, most components in the 100 Gbit/s packet processing path (PHY chips, NPUs, memories) were not readily available off-the-shelf or require extensive qualification and co-design. Another problem is related to the low-output production of 100 Gbit/s optical components, which were also not easily availableespecially in pluggable, long-reach or tunable laser flavors.

Backplane
NetLogic Microsystems announced backplane modules in October 2010.

Multimode fiber
In 2009, Mellanox and Reflex Photonics announced modules based on the CFP agreement.

Single mode fiber
Finisar, Sumitomo Electric Industries, and OpNext all demonstrated singlemode 40 or 100 Gbit/s Ethernet modules based on the C form-factor pluggable (CFP) agreement at the European Conference and Exhibition on Optical Communication in 2009.

Compatibility
Optical fiber IEEE 802.3ba implementations were not compatible with the numerous 40 and 100 Gbit/s line rate transport systems because they had different optical layer and modulation formats as the IEEE 802.3ba interface types show. In particular, existing 40 Gbit/s transport solutions that used dense wavelength-division multiplexing to pack four 10 Gbit/s signals into one optical medium were not compatible with the IEEE 802.3ba standard, which used either coarse WDM in 1310 nm wavelength region with four 25 Gbit/s or ten 10 Gbit/s channels, or parallel optics with four or ten optical fibers per direction.

Test and measurement
 Quellan announced a test board in 2009.
 Ixia developed Physical Coding Sublayer Lanes and demonstrated a working 100GbE link through a test setup at NXTcomm in June 2008. Ixia announced test equipment in November 2008.
 Discovery Semiconductors introduced optoelectronics converters for 100 Gbit/s testing of the 10 km and 40 km Ethernet standards in February 2009.
 JDS Uniphase (now VIAVI Solutions) introduced test and measurement products for 40 and 100 Gbit/s Ethernet in August 2009.
 Spirent Communications introduced test and measurement products in September 2009.
 EXFO demonstrated interoperability in January 2010.
 Xena Networks demonstrated test equipment at the Technical University of Denmark in January 2011.
 Calnex Solutions introduced 100GbE Synchronous Ethernet synchronisation test equipment in November 2014.
 Spirent Communications introduced the Attero-100G for 100GbE and 40GbE impairment emulation in April 2015.
 VeEX introduced its CFP-based UX400-100GE and 40GE test and measurement platform in 2012, followed by CFP2, CFP4, QSFP28 and QSFP+ versions in 2015.

Mellanox Technologies
Mellanox Technologies introduced the ConnectX-4 100GbE single and dual port adapter in November 2014. In the same period, Mellanox introduced availability of 100GbE copper and fiber cables. In June 2015, Mellanox introduced the Spectrum 10, 25, 40, 50 and 100GbE switch models.

Aitia
Aitia International introduced the C-GEP FPGA-based switching platform in February 2013. Aitia also produce 100G/40G Ethernet PCS/PMA+MAC IP cores for FPGA developers and academic researchers.

Arista
Arista Networks introduced the 7500E switch (with up to 96 100GbE ports) in April 2013. In July 2014, Arista introduced the 7280E switch (the world's first top-of-rack switch with 100G uplink ports).

Extreme Networks
Extreme Networks introduced a four-port 100GbE module for the BlackDiamond X8 core switch in November 2012.

Dell
Dell's Force10 switches support 40 Gbit/s interfaces. These 40 Gbit/s fiber-optical interfaces using QSFP+ transceivers can be found on the Z9000 distributed core switches, S4810 and S4820 as well as the blade-switches MXL and the IO-Aggregator. The Dell PowerConnect 8100 series switches also offer 40 Gbit/s QSFP+ interfaces.

Chelsio
Chelsio Communications introduced 40 Gbit/s Ethernet network adapters (based on the fifth generation of its Terminator architecture) in June 2013.

Telesoft Technologies Ltd
Telesoft Technologies announced the dual 100G PCIe accelerator card, part of the MPAC-IP series. Telesoft also announced the STR 400G (Segmented Traffic Router) and the 100G MCE (Media Converter and Extension).

Commercial trials and deployments
Unlike the "race to 10 Gbit/s" that was driven by the imminent need to address growth pains of the Internet in the late 1990s, customer interest in 100 Gbit/s technologies was mostly driven by economic factors. The common reasons to adopt the higher speeds were:
 to reduce the number of optical wavelengths ("lambdas") used and the need to light new fiber
 to utilize bandwidth more efficiently than 10 Gbit/s link aggregate groups
 to provide cheaper wholesale, internet peering and data center connectivity
 to skip the relatively expensive 40 Gbit/s technology and move directly from 10 to 100 Gbit/s

Alcatel-Lucent
In November 2007, Alcatel-Lucent held the first field trial of 100 Gbit/s optical transmission. Completed over a live, in-service 504 kilometre portion of the Verizon network, it connected the Florida cities of Tampa and Miami.

100GbE interfaces for the 7450 ESS/7750 SR service routing platform were first announced in June 2009, with field trials with Verizon, T-Systems and Portugal Telecom taking place in June–September 2010. In September 2009, Alcatel-Lucent combined the 100G capabilities of its IP routing and optical transport portfolio in an integrated solution called Converged Backbone Transformation.

In June 2011, Alcatel-Lucent introduced a packet processing architecture known as FP3, advertised for 400 Gbit/s rates. Alcatel-Lucent announced the XRS 7950 core router (based on the FP3) in May 2012.

Brocade
Brocade Communications Systems introduced their first 100GbE products (based on the former Foundry Networks MLXe hardware) in September 2010. In June 2011, the new product went live at the AMS-IX traffic exchange point in Amsterdam.

Cisco
Cisco Systems and Comcast announced their 100GbE trials in June 2008. However, it is doubtful that this transmission could approach 100 Gbit/s speeds when using a 40 Gbit/s per slot CRS-1 platform for packet processing. Cisco's first deployment of 100GbE at AT&T and Comcast took place in April 2011.  In the same year, Cisco tested the 100GbE interface between CRS-3 and a new generation of their ASR9K edge router model. In 2017, Cisco announced a 32 port 100GbE Cisco Catalyst 9500 Series switch   and in 2019 the modular Catalyst 9600 Series switch with a 100GbE line card

Huawei
In October 2008, Huawei presented their first 100GbE interface for their NE5000e router. In September 2009, Huawei also demonstrated an end-to-end 100 Gbit/s link. It was mentioned that Huawei's products had the self-developed NPU "Solar 2.0 PFE2A" onboard and was using pluggable optics in CFP.

In a mid-2010 product brief, the NE5000e linecards were given the commercial name LPUF-100 and credited with using two Solar-2.0 NPUs per 100GbE port in opposite (ingress/egress) configuration. Nevertheless, in October 2010, the company referenced shipments of NE5000e to Russian cell operator "Megafon" as "40GBPS/slot" solution, with "scalability up to" 100 Gbit/s.

In April 2011, Huawei announced that the NE5000e was updated to carry 2x100GbE interfaces per slot using LPU-200 linecards. In a related solution brief, Huawei reported 120 thousand Solar 1.0 integrated circuits shipped to customers, but no Solar 2.0 numbers were given. Following the August 2011 trial in Russia, Huawei reported paying 100 Gbit/s DWDM customers, but no 100GbE shipments on NE5000e.

Juniper
Juniper Networks announced 100GbE for its T-series routers in June 2009. The 1x100GbE option followed in Nov 2010, when a joint press release with academic backbone network Internet2 marked the first production 100GbE interfaces going live in real network.

In the same year, Juniper demonstrated 100GbE operation between core (T-series) and edge (MX 3D) routers. Juniper, in March 2011, announced first shipments of 100GbE interfaces to a major North American service provider (Verizon).

In April 2011, Juniper deployed a 100GbE system on the UK education network JANET. In July 2011, Juniper announced 100GbE with Australian ISP iiNet on their T1600 routing platform. Juniper started shipping the MPC3E line card for the MX router, a 100GbE CFP MIC, and a 100GbE LR4 CFP optics in March 2012. In Spring 2013, Juniper Networks announced the availability of the MPC4E line card for the MX router that includes 2 100GbE CFP slots and 8 10GbE SFP+ interfaces.

In June 2015, Juniper Networks announced the availability of its CFP-100GBASE-ZR module which is a plug & play solution that brings 80 km 100GbE to MX & PTX based networks. The CFP-100GBASE-ZR module uses DP-QPSK modulation and coherent receiver technology with an optimized DSP and FEC implementation. The low-power module can be directly retrofitted into existing CFP sockets on MX and PTX routers.

Standards
The IEEE 802.3 working group is concerned with the maintenance and extension of the Ethernet data communications standard. Additions to the 802.3 standard are performed by task forces which are designated by one or two letters. For example, the 802.3z task force drafted the original Gigabit Ethernet standard.

802.3ba is the designation given to the higher speed Ethernet task force which completed its work to modify the 802.3 standard to support speeds higher than 10 Gbit/s in 2010.

The speeds chosen by 802.3ba were 40 and 100 Gbit/s to support both end-point and link aggregation needs respectively. This was the first time two different Ethernet speeds were specified in a single standard.  The decision to include both speeds came from pressure to support the 40 Gbit/s rate for local server applications and the 100 Gbit/s rate for internet backbones. The standard was announced in July 2007 and was ratified on June 17, 2010.

The 40/100 Gigabit Ethernet standards encompass a number of different Ethernet physical layer (PHY) specifications. A networking device may support different PHY types by means of pluggable modules. Optical modules are not standardized by any official standards body but are in multi-source agreements (MSAs). One agreement that supports 40 and 100 Gigabit Ethernet is the CFP MSA which was adopted for distances of 100+ meters. QSFP and CXP connector modules support shorter distances.

The standard supports only  full-duplex operation. Other objectives include:

 Preserve the 802.3 Ethernet frame format utilizing the 802.3 MAC
 Preserve minimum and maximum frame size of current 802.3 standard
 Support a bit error rate (BER) better than or equal to 10−12 at the MAC/PLS service interface
 Provide appropriate support for OTN
 Support MAC data rates of 40 and 100 Gbit/s
 Provide physical layer specifications (PHY) for operation over single-mode optical fiber (SMF), laser optimized multi-mode optical fiber  (MMF) OM3 and OM4, copper cable assembly, and backplane.

The following nomenclature is used for the physical layers:

The 100 m laser optimized multi-mode fiber (OM3) objective was met by parallel ribbon cable with 850 nm wavelength 10GBASE-SR like optics (40GBASE-SR4 and 100GBASE-SR10). The backplane objective with 4 lanes of 10GBASE-KR type PHYs (40GBASE-KR4). The copper cable objective is met with 4 or 10 differential lanes using SFF-8642 and SFF-8436 connectors. The 10 and 40 km 100 Gbit/s objectives with four wavelengths (around 1310 nm) of 25 Gbit/s optics (100GBASE-LR4 and 100GBASE-ER4) and the 10 km 40 Gbit/s objective with four wavelengths (around 1310 nm) of 10 Gbit/s optics (40GBASE-LR4).

In January 2010 another IEEE project authorization started a task force to define a 40 Gbit/s serial single-mode optical fiber standard (40GBASE-FR). This was approved as standard 802.3bg in March 2011. It used 1550 nm optics, had a reach of 2 km and was capable of receiving 1550 nm and 1310 nm wavelengths of light. The capability to receive 1310 nm light allows it to inter-operate with a longer reach 1310 nm PHY should one ever be developed. 1550 nm was chosen as the wavelength for 802.3bg transmission to make it compatible with existing test equipment and infrastructure.

In December 2010, a 10x10 multi-source agreement (10x10 MSA) began  to define an optical Physical Medium Dependent (PMD) sublayer and establish compatible sources of low-cost, low-power, pluggable optical transceivers based on 10 optical lanes at 10 Gbit/s each.  The 10x10 MSA was intended as a lower cost alternative to 100GBASE-LR4 for applications which do not require a link length longer than 2 km. It was intended for use with standard single mode G.652.C/D type low water peak cable with ten wavelengths ranging from 1523 to 1595 nm.  The founding members were Google, Brocade Communications, JDSU and Santur.
Other member companies of the 10x10 MSA  included MRV, Enablence, Cyoptics, AFOP, oplink, Hitachi Cable America, AMS-IX, EXFO, Huawei, Kotura, Facebook and Effdon when the 2 km specification was announced in March 2011.
The 10X10 MSA  modules were intended to be the same size as the CFP specifications.

On June 12, 2014, the 802.3bj standard was approved. The 802.3bj standard specifies 100 Gbit/s 4x25G PHYs - 100GBASE-KR4, 100GBASE-KP4 and 100GBASE-CR4 - for backplane and twin-ax cable.

On February 16, 2015, the 802.3bm standard was approved. The 802.3bm standard specifies a lower-cost optical 100GBASE-SR4 PHY for MMF and a four-lane chip-to-module and chip-to-chip electrical specification (CAUI-4). The detailed objectives for the 802.3bm project can be found on the 802.3 website.

On May 14, 2018, the 802.3ck project was approved. This has objectives to:
 Define a single-lane 100 Gbit/s Attachment Unit interface (AUI) for chip-to-module applications, compatible with PMDs based on 100 Gbit/s per lane optical signaling (100GAUI-1 C2M)
 Define a single-lane 100 Gbit/s Attachment Unit Interface (AUI) for chip-to-chip applications (100GAUI-1 C2C)
 Define a single-lane 100 Gbit/s PHY for operation over electrical backplanes supporting an insertion loss ≤ 28 dB at 26.56 GHz (100GBASE-KR1).
 Define a single-lane 100 Gbit/s PHY for operation over twin-axial copper cables with lengths up to at least 2 m (100GBASE-CR1).

On November 12, 2018, the IEEE P802.3ct Task Force started working to define PHY supporting 100 Gbit/s operation on a single wavelength capable of at least 80 km over a DWDM system (100GBASE-ZR) (using a combination of phase and amplitude modulation with coherent detection).

On December 5, 2018, the 802.3cd standard was approved. The 802.3cd standard specifies PHYs using 50Gbit/s lanes - 100GBASE-KR2 for backplane, 100GBASE-CR2 for twin-ax cable, 100GBASE-SR2 for MMF and using 100Gbit/s signalling 100GBASE-DR for SMF.

In June 2020, the IEEE P802.3db Task Force started working to define a physical layer specification that supports 100 Gbit/s operation over 1 pair of MMF with lengths up to at least 50 m. 

On February 11, 2021, the IEEE 802.3cu standard was approved. The IEEE 802.3cu standard defines single-wavelength 100 Gbit/s PHYs for operation over SMF (Single-Mode Fiber) with lengths up to at least 2 km (100GBASE-FR1) and 10 km (100GBASE-LR1).

100G interface types

Coding schemes 
 10.3125 Gbaud with NRZ ("PAM2") and 64b66b on 10 lanes per direction
 One of the earliest coding used, this widens the coding scheme used in single lane 10GE and quad lane 40G to use 10 lanes. Due to the low symbol rate, relatively long ranges can be achieved at the cost of using a lot of cabling.
 This also allows breakout to 10×10GE, provided that the hardware supports splitting the port.

 25.78125 Gbaud with NRZ ("PAM2") and 64b66b on 4 lanes per direction
 A sped-up variant of the above, this directly corresponds to 10GE/40GE signalling at 2.5× speed. The higher symbol rate makes links more susceptible to errors.
 If the device and transceiver support dual-speed operation, it is possible to reconfigure an 100G port to downspeed to 40G or 4×10G. There is no autonegotiation protocol for this, thus manual configuration is necessary.  Similarly, a port can be broken into 4×25G if implemented in the hardware. This is applicable even for CWDM4, if a CWDM demultiplexer and CWDM 25G optics are used appropriately.

 25.78125 Gbaud with NRZ ("PAM2") and RS-FEC(528,514) on 4 lanes per direction
 To address the higher susceptibility to errors at these symbol rates, an application of Reed–Solomon error correction was defined in IEEE 802.3bj / Clause 91.  This replaces the 64b66b encoding with a 256b257b encoding followed by the RS-FEC application, which combines to the exact same overhead as 64b66b.  To the optical transceiver or cable, there is no distinction between this and 64b66b;  some interface types (e.g. CWDM4) are defined "with or without FEC."

 26.5625 Gbaud with PAM4 and RS-FEC(544,514) on 2 lanes per direction
 This achieves a further doubling in bandwidth per lane (used to halve the number of lanes) by employing pulse-amplitude modulation with 4 distinct analog levels, making each symbol carry 2 bits.  To keep up error margins, the FEC overhead is doubled from 2.7% to 5.8%, which explains the slight rise in symbol rate.

 53.125 Gbaud with PAM4 and RS-FEC(544,514) on 1 lane per direction
 Further pushing silicon limits, this is a double rate variant of the previous, giving full 100GE operation over 1 medium lane.

 30.14475 Gbaud with DP-DQPSK and SD-FEC on 1 lane per direction
 Mirroring OTN4 developments, DP-DQPSK (dual polarization differential quadrature phase shift keying) employs polarization to carry one axis of the DP-QPSK constellation.  Additionally, new soft decision FEC algorithms take additional information on analog signal levels as input to the error correction procedure.

 13.59375 Gbaud with PAM4, KP4 specific coding and RS-FEC(544,514) on 4 lanes per direction
 A half-speed variant of 26.5625 Gbaud with RS-FEC, with a 31320/31280 step encoding the lane number into the signal, and further 92/90 framing.

40G interface types 

 
CL73 allows communication between the 2 PHYs to exchange technical capability pages, and both PHYs come to a common speed and media type. Completion of CL73 initiates CL72. CL72 allows each of the 4 lanes' transmitters to adjust pre-emphasis via feedback from the link partner.

 
 40GBASE-T is a port type for 4-pair balanced twisted-pair Cat.8 copper cabling up to 30 m defined in IEEE 802.3bq. IEEE 802.3bq-2016 standard was approved by The IEEE-SA Standards Board on June 30, 2016. It uses 16-level PAM signaling over four lanes at 3,200 MBaud each, scaled up from 10GBASE-T.

Chip-to-chip/chip-to-module interfaces
 
 CAUI-10 is a 100 Gbit/s 10-lane electrical interface defined in 802.3ba.

 
 CAUI-4 is a 100 Gbit/s  4-lane electrical interface defined in 802.3bm Annex 83E with a nominal signaling rate for each lane of 25.78125 GBd using NRZ modulation.

 
 100GAUI-4 is a 100 Gbit/s  4-lane electrical interface defined in 802.3cd Annex 135D/E with a nominal signaling rate for each lane of 26.5625 GBd using NRZ modulation and RS-FEC(544,514) so suitable for use with 100GBASE-CR2, 100GBASE-KR2, 100GBASE-SR2, 100GBASE-DR, 100GBASE-FR1, 100GBASE-LR1 PHYs.

 
 100GAUI-2 is a 100 Gbit/s  2-lane electrical interface defined in 802.3cd Annex 135F/G with a nominal signaling rate for each lane of 26.5625 GBd using PAM4 modulation and RS-FEC(544,514) so suitable for use with 100GBASE-CR2, 100GBASE-KR2, 100GBASE-SR2, 100GBASE-DR, 100GBASE-FR1, 100GBASE-LR1 PHYs.

 
 100GAUI-1 is a 100 Gbit/s  1-lane electrical interface defined in 802.3ck Annex 120F/G with a nominal signaling rate for each lane of 53.125 GBd using PAM4 modulation and RS-FEC(544,514) so suitable for use with 100GBASE-CR1, 100GBASE-KR1, 100GBASE-SR1, 100GBASE-DR, 100GBASE-FR1, 100GBASE-LR1 PHYs.

Pluggable optics standards
 
 The QSFP+ form factor is specified for use with the 40 Gigabit Ethernet.  Copper direct attached cable (DAC) or optical modules are supported, see Figure 85–20 in the 802.3 spec. QSFP+ modules at 40Gbit/s can also be used to provide four independent ports of 10 gigabit Ethernet.

 
 CFP modules use the 10-lane CAUI-10 electrical interface.

 CFP2 modules use the 10-lane CAUI-10 electrical interface or the 4-lane CAUI-4 electrical interface.

 CFP4 modules use the 4-lane CAUI-4 electrical interface.

 QSFP28 modules use the CAUI-4 electrical interface.

 SFP-DD or Small Form-factor Pluggable – Double Density modules use the 100GAUI-2 electrical interface.

 Cisco's CPAK optical module uses the four lane CEI-28G-VSR electrical interface.

 There are also CXP and HD module standards. CXP modules use the CAUI-10 electrical interface.

Optical connectors
Short reach interfaces use Multiple-Fiber Push-On/Pull-off (MPO) optical connectors. 40GBASE-SR4 and 100GBASE-SR4 use MPO-12 while 100GBASE-SR10 uses MPO-24 with one optical lane per fiber strand.
 
Long reach interfaces use duplex LC connectors with all optical lanes multiplexed with WDM.

See also 

 Ethernet Alliance
 InfiniBand
 Interconnect bottleneck
 Optical communication
 Fiber-optic cable
 Optical transport network
 Parallel optical interface
 Terabit Ethernet

References

Further reading

Overview of Requirements and Applications for 40 Gigabit Ethernet and 100 Gigabit Ethernet Technology Overview White Paper (Archived 2009-08-01) – Ethernet Alliance
40 Gigabit Ethernet and 100 Gigabit Ethernet Technology Overview White Paper – Ethernet Alliance

External links
 Ethernet Alliance
 
 IEEE P802.3ba 40Gbit/s and 100Gbit/s Ethernet Task Force
 IEEE P802.3ba 40Gbit/s and 100Gbit/s Ethernet Task Force public area
 Higher Speed Study Group documents

Ethernet